Estadio Municipal de San Bernardo is a stadium in San Bernardo, Santiago. It's Magallanes' home stadium.

The stadium holds 3,500 people.

References

Sports venues in Santiago
M